Anna Maria Achenrainer (Pfunds, 5 July 1909 – Innsbruck, 14 January 1972) was an Austrian writer.

Life
Her father died in World War I and she was taken to an orphanage.

She learnt schoolteaching in Innsbruck, where she started publishing her poems in the magazine Tiroler Volksboten, and she was also one of the founders of the literacy association Turmbund.

She died in 1972, and her tomb is in a cemetery of Mühlau, Innsbruck.

Prizes
1950: Grand Austrian State Prize (Großer Österreichischer Staatspreis ) for Appassionata
 1970: Order of Merit of the State of Tyrol ( Verdienstkreuz des Landes Tirol)

Works 
Appassionata. Gedichte. Inn, Innsbruck, 1950
Der zwölfblättrige Lotos. Gedichte. Egger, Imst, 1957
Der grüne Kristall. Gedichte. Mit Linolschnitten von Margarethe Krieger. S. Gideon, Gießen, 1960
Die Windrose. Gedichte. Rohrer, Vienna and Innsbruck, 1962
Das geflügelte Licht. Gedichte. Mit Rohrfederzeichnungen von Rudolf Kreuzer. Wagner, Innsbruck, 1963
Frauenbildnisse aus Tirol. 21 Biographien. Wagner, Innsbruck, 1964
Horizonte der Hoffnung. Gedichte. Eingeleitet und ausgewählt von Franz Hölbing. Stiasny, Graz, 1966
Lob des Dunkels und des Lichts. Gedichte. ÖVA, Vienna, 1968
Zeit der Sonnenuhren. Ein Jahrbuch. Karlsruher Bote, Karlsruhe, 1969
Antonia van Mer. Erzählung. ÖVA, Vienna, 1972

References

Sources 
 . Biographisch-bibliographisches Handbuch. 3., völlig neu bearbeitete Auflage. Hg. Wilhelm Kosch (Begr.), Hubert Herkommer and Konrad Feilchenfeldt. Francke, Bern und München, 1968 Band 1, Seite 7
 Elisabeth Pfurtscheller: Anna Maria Achenrainer (1909 - 1972). Die Stellung der Lyrikerin im Tiroler Literatur- und Kulturbetrieb der 50er und 60er Jahre, dargestellt anhand ihres Nachlasses. Universität Innsbruck, 2006
 Paul Wimmer: Wegweiser durch die Literatur Tirols seit 1945. Bläschke, Darmstadt, 1978 Seite 22ff.

External links 
 
 Biographie im Brenner-Archiv

1909 births
1973 deaths
20th-century Austrian writers
20th-century Austrian women writers
People from Tyrol (state)